Kerns is a township in the Canadian province of Ontario. Located within the Timiskaming District, Kerns is located directly northwest of the city of Temiskaming Shores. Its primary named settlements are the communities of Highland, Milberta, and McCool.

Demographics 

See also
List of francophone communities in Ontario

References

External links

 Official website

Municipalities in Timiskaming District
Single-tier municipalities in Ontario
Township municipalities in Ontario